A list of books and essays about artist and filmmaker Jean Cocteau:

Cocteau, Jean
Jean Cocteau